Metfield Meadow is a  biological Site of Special Scientific Interest west of Halesworth in Suffolk. It is owned and managed by Suffolk Wildlife Trust under the name Winks Meadow.

This meadow on a disused airfield is unimproved grassland, with a rich variety of flora on chalky boulder clay. There are many green-winged orchids, cowslips and pepper saxifrages. The meadow is grazed by cattle or cut for hay to maintain the diversity of the wild flowers.

There is access to the site from Nunn's Lane.

References

Suffolk Wildlife Trust
Sites of Special Scientific Interest in Suffolk